Sebastian Przyrowski (born 30 November 1981) is a Polish professional footballer who plays as a goalkeeper for Pogoń Grodzisk Mazowiecki.

Career
In 2000, Polonia Warszawa bought him from his first club, Pilica Białobrzegi.  He only played in Polonia's reserve team, so he returned to Pilica during the winter transfer window. In 2001, he moved to Dyskobolia Grodzisk Wielkopolski. He debuted in the Polish first division on 2 March 2002, playing against Górnik Zabrze. In 2008, he moved to the Polish capital after Dyskobolia merged with Polonia Warsaw.

Przyrowski made his first appearance for Poland in 2005, in a match against Serbia & Montenegro. He has played a total of nine times for his country.

Honours
 Orange Ekstraklasa bronze medal in 2003/04 with Dyskobolia
 Polish Cup 2005 and 2007 with Dyskobolia
 Lobanovskis Cup 2005 with Poland

External links
 
 National team stats on the website of the Polish Football Association 
 

1981 births
Living people
Polish footballers
Poland international footballers
Association football goalkeepers
Dyskobolia Grodzisk Wielkopolski players
Obra Kościan players
Polonia Warsaw players
Ekstraklasa players
I liga players
III liga players
IV liga players
Levadiakos F.C. players
GKS Tychy players
Górnik Zabrze players
People from Białobrzegi County
Sportspeople from Masovian Voivodeship
Polish expatriate footballers
Expatriate footballers in Greece
Polish expatriate sportspeople in Greece